KOLD-TV (channel 13) is a television station in Tucson, Arizona, United States, affiliated with CBS. It is owned by Gray Television, which provides certain services to Fox affiliate KMSB (channel 11) and MyNetworkTV affiliate KTTU (channel 18) under a shared services agreement (SSA) with Tegna Inc. The three stations share studios on North Business Park Drive on the northwest side of Tucson (near the Casas Adobes neighborhood). KOLD-TV's primary transmitter is atop Mount Bigelow, with a secondary transmitter atop the Tucson Mountains west of the city to fill in gaps in coverage.

Established in February 1953, KOLD-TV is the second-oldest television station in the state and was the first on air in Tucson. It has been affiliated with CBS for its entire history. The station produces local newscasts that, since the 2000s, have been competitive in the local ratings.

History

Construction and Autry-Chauncey ownership
In the wake of the Federal Communications Commission (FCC) lifting its freeze on the award of new television stations, three Tucson radio stations applied for three channels. The Old Pueblo Broadcasting Company, owner of KOPO (1450 AM) and owned by Gene Autry and Tom Chauncey, filed for channel 13 without opposition on June 21 and was granted a construction permit to build on November 12. KOPO-TV was built relatively quickly: construction got underway in early December on an interim transmitter facility mounted on the AM radio tower, as  towers were not yet available, and on a television addition to the KOPO radio facility on West Drachman Street.

On January 13, 1953, at 1:13:13 p.m., the KOPO-TV transmitter was turned on. No programming was aired, as construction on the remainder of the television addition to the building was still in progress, until February 1, when the station began to carry CBS and DuMont Television Network programming. The day before, a dedicatory program was broadcast from the studios. Network presentations had to be aired from kinescopes until a coaxial cable hookup was completed in September to be shared by KOPO-TV and new station KVOA-TV.

KOPO radio and television became KOLD radio and television on April 30, 1957. The KOLD call letters had been used by the Autry station in Yuma until it was sold; that outlet became KOFA and closed in 1963. (The designation also paired well with KOOL radio and television in Phoenix, which was commonly owned, and as was done in Phoenix, the phones were answered "It's KOLD in Tucson".) The main transmitter was moved to Mount Bigelow in 1961, simultaneously with KVOA-TV; KGUN-TV had been built on the mountain five years prior.

Evening News, Knight Ridder, and News-Press and Gazette ownership
In December 1968, Autry and Chauncey announced the sale of KOLD-TV, separate from the radio station, for $3.8 million to the Universal Communications Corporation, the broadcasting arm of the Detroit-based Evening News Association. The FCC approved of the deal in 1969, though it required the E. W. Scripps Trust to divest itself of its holding in the Evening News Association, as Scripps-Howard Broadcasting owned four VHF stations and Evening News now would own two (KOLD-TV and WWJ-TV in Detroit). The commission tweaked the ruling to allow Scripps to retain an interest of one percent. The radio station reverted to its former KOPO designation.

The Gannett Company purchased the Evening News Association on September 5, 1985, for $717 million, thwarting a $566 million hostile takeover bid by L.P. Media Inc., owned by television producer Norman Lear and media executive A. Jerrold Perenchio. The merged company could not retain channel 13. Gannett already owned the Tucson Citizen newspaper, and channel 13's signal slightly overlapped with Gannett-owned KPNX in Phoenix. Gannett subsequently spun off KOLD-TV, along with KTVY in Oklahoma City and WALA-TV in Mobile, Alabama, to Knight Ridder Broadcasting for $160 million.

Knight Ridder subsequently announced in October 1988 their intent to sell their station group to help reduce a $929 million debt load and finance a $353 million acquisition of online information provider Dialog Information Services. The News-Press & Gazette Company (NPG) acquired KOLD on June 26, 1989, spending $18 million. It implemented budget cuts in the newsroom, which was wracked by employee turnover as a result. NPG also moved KOLD from Mount Bigelow to the Tucson Mountains west of the city; this improved reception in some parts of the city that had terrain blockages but affected as many as 15 percent of the station's viewers, notably in outlying areas such as Benson, Arizona, and created signal ingress issues for cable subscribers.

Turnaround
In 1993, New Vision Television, a new broadcast station group based in Lansing, Michigan, bought NPG's entire television station group of the time, which included KOLD and stations in five other markets. New Vision took over before the end of the year and immediately made moves to shore up flagging employee morale at KOLD. In addition to a new general manager, New Vision began planning for a new facility on Tucson's northwest side with nearly twice as much space as the Drachman facility, which the station had outgrown. The new facility, outfitted with a news studio called the "Newsplex", debuted in late 1994, before New Vision sold its stations to Ellis Communications in 1995; Ellis was in turn folded into Raycom Media in 1997. Raycom would house its centralized design operation, Raycom Design Group, in Tucson.

Shared services agreement with KMSB and KTTU
On November 15, 2011, the Belo Corporation, then-owner of local Fox affiliate KMSB and MyNetworkTV affiliate KTTU, announced that it would enter into a shared services agreement (SSA) with Raycom Media beginning in February 2012, resulting in KOLD taking over the two stations' operations and moving their advertising sales department to the KOLD studios. All remaining positions at KMSB and KTTU, including news, engineering and production, were eliminated, and master control operations moved from Belo's KTVK in Phoenix to KOLD. Though FCC rules disallow common ownership of more than two stations in the same market, combined SSA/duopoly operations are permissible.

Sale to Gray Television
In 2018, Raycom Media was acquired by Gray Television. The $3.6 billion transaction gave Gray its first station in Arizona. The arrangements with KMSB and KTTU remained unchanged. The sale was approved on December 20 of that year and was completed on January 2, 2019.

News operation

Originally, local news programming for KOPO-TV/KOLD-TV was provided by KOOL-TV in Phoenix. However, by the 1960s, the station was leading the news ratings in the Tucson market, a status it would hold until the late 1970s, when KVOA took the lead. The station continued in second or third place for the next quarter-century, with the station (and CBS) reaching a nadir by the time that it was acquired by News Press & Gazette. Budget cuts meant outdated equipment that broke down, while a series of anchors were fired and replaced with cheaper, entry-level talent. Vic Caputo, who had spent seven years at channel 13, was released by his contract in a decision he attributed to the owners' "money crunch". NPG fired sports anchor Kevin McCabe days before Christmas in a dispute that led to a lawsuit over severance pay. Weatherman Pat Evans was told that there was a "big plan" for him, but when he asked, they would not reveal it; he declined to sign a new contract and took a new job in Sacramento, California.

In the late 1990s, KOLD-TV became Tucson's first station to operate a news helicopter. Despite these improvements, newscast ratings continued to languish far behind the other two major stations, with channel 13 drawing half as many news viewers.

However, the 2000s would change that picture. Ratings improved, and the station won its first and (to date) only Alfred I. duPont–Columbia University Award, given in 2001 to Chip Yost for a story about exploding fuel tanks in police cars. By 2004, KOLD had pulled ahead of KVOA in all evening timeslots in the 25–54 demo, a feat which had not occurred in Tucson in 25 years. During this time, KOLD-TV also produced a 9 p.m. local newscast for KWBA-TV from 2003 to 2005. Not all were happy: anchor Randy Garsee was fired in 2006 after sending an email to all employees criticizing the news director for "micromanaging".

As part of taking over KMSB's operations, KOLD-TV took over its local 9 p.m. newscast and added a weekday morning newscast, with the existing KMSB news team laid off. KMSB and KOLD also introduced a shared website, originally branded Tucson News Now.

In 2022, Gray introduced new 9 a.m. and 3 p.m. newscasts for KOLD.

Technical information

Subchannels
The station's digital signal is multiplexed:

Analog-to-digital transition
KOLD-TV discontinued regular programming on its analog signal, over VHF channel 13, on June 12, 2009, as part of the federally mandated transition from analog to digital television. The station's digital signal remained on its pre-transition UHF channel 32.

While KOLD's analog signal originated from a transmitter site in the Tucson Mountains west of downtown, KOLD's primary digital transmitter is at the Mount Bigelow transmitter site to the northeast of the city, where the major Tucson stations built a common digital transmission facility in 2003. The Tucson Mountains site was then converted to a digital replacement translator on channel 13 to provide service to the Catalina Foothills.

References

Notes

External links
 Official website

OLD-TV
Television channels and stations established in 1953
1953 establishments in Arizona
CBS network affiliates
MeTV affiliates
Circle (TV network) affiliates
Defy TV affiliates
Former Gannett subsidiaries
Gray Television
Low-power television stations in the United States